Telangana Rashtra Party (Telangana Nation's Party), TRP, is a political party in the Indian state of Andhra Pradesh. TRP works for the creation of a separate Telangana state.

TRP was founded in Hyderabad on October 11, 2002 by G. Innaiah (alias Gade Inna Reddy). Innaiah had been the district secretary of People's War Group and the general secretary of Telangana Rashtra Samithi. A.R. Ramesh Kumar is the TRP president.

The flag of the party is green, with a white map of Telangana.

TRP gained publicity at occasions when members of the party has threatened to commit suicide if government policies wouldn't change on specific matters.

Ahead of the 2004 elections TRP joined the Telangana Rashtra Sadhana Front, a front of dissident pro-Telangana factions.

Following the debacle of TRP in the 2004 elections, G. Innaiah has been accused of involvement in bomb blast of the Telangana Liberation Force in November the same year.
He is the Great social worker.he is running Orphanage homes.

References

Political parties in Telangana
2002 establishments in Andhra Pradesh
Political parties established in 2002